The 2004 Linfield Wildcats football team was an American football team that represented Linfield University as a member of the Northwest Conference (NWC) during the 2004 NCAA Division III football season. In their ninth season under head coach Jay Locey, the Wildcats compiled a perfect 13–0 record and won the NCAA Division III national championship.  

The team opened its season with a 58–17 victory over Division II . The following week, Linfield, ranked No. 2 in Division III, traveled east to face No. 7 , winning that game by a 46–35 score. 

After sweeping through the regular season and winning an NWC championship, the Wildcats advanced to the Division III playoffs.

Quarterback Brett Elliott broke the NCAA single-season touchdown record. His season total of 59 touchdown passes included a school record seven in the Division III quarterfinal game against Occidental. Elliott played high school football in Lake Oswego, Oregon, began his college career playing for Urban Meyer at Division I Utah, and transferred to Linfield after losing the starting job to Alex Smith.

Jay Locey won the AFCA Coach of the Year for NCAA Division III for the 2004 NCAA Division III football season. 

Linfield also won NAIA national championships in 1982, 1984, and 1986. The program extended its record to 49 consecutive seasons with a winning record, the longest such streak in all divisions of college football.

Schedule

Roster

 99	Robert Acevedo		4-6	Jr.	Truckee, Calif. / Truckee
 88	Daren Ackerman		3-6	Jr.	Banks, Ore. / Banks
 22	Sunder Aldridge		11-5	Jr.	Omak, Wash. / Omak
 8	Casey Allen		3-6	Sr.	Newport, Ore. / Newport
 70	Kaipo Amina		2-6	Fr.	Cornelius, Ore. / Forest Grove
 17	Jonny Anderson		10-5	Jr.	Kenmore, Wash. / Texas Tech
 22	Josh Armstrong		11-5	Sr.	Oregon City, Ore. / Oregon City
 97	Nathan Arnold		3-6	Fr.	Edmonds, Wash. / Edmonds-Woodway
 80	Tyson Banker		10-5	So.	Hermiston, Ore. / Hermiston
 8	Andrew Bean		0-6	So.	Newcastle, Wash. / Eastside Catholic
 61	Dimitri Beauliere		0-6	Fr.	Vancouver, Wash. / Mountain View
 12	Tim Benzel		3-6	Jr.	Vancouver, Wash. / Evergreen
 40	Kelley Bertrand		5-6	Sr.	Dundee, Ore. / Newberg
 86	Taylor Bethell		5-6	Jr.	Albany, Ore. / West Albany
 31	Chris Boock		8-5	Sr.	Salem, Ore. / South Salem
 34	Rodd Booth		10-5	So.	Clackamas, Ore. / Barlow
 40	Michael Borden		11-5	Fr.	Mesa, Ariz. / Dobson
 1	Jordan Boustead		11-5	Fr.	Dallas, Ore. / Dallas
 6	Brock Britt		10-5	Fr.	Salem, Ore. / West Salem
 44	Rob Brown		10-5	Jr.	Medford, Ore. / South Medford
 17	Jake Buzzetta		10-5	Fr.	Hollister, Calif. / San Benito
 42	Ryan Caffall		11-5	Jr.	Newberg, Ore. / Whitworth
 81	Brandon Carpenter		11-5	So.	Redmond, Ore. / Redmond
 81	Kyle Carpenter		2-6	Sr.	The Dalles, Ore. / U. Oregon
 26	Dan Carter		11-5	Fr.	Gig Harbor, Wash. / Gig Harbor
 2	George Carter		4-6	Sr.	Salem, Ore. / South Salem
 95	Brock Cote		3-6	Fr.	Kirkland, Wash. / Lake Washington
 25	Ian Crosby		0-6	Fr.	Salem, Ore. / South Salem
 20	Pete Cruickshank		7-5	So.	Cashmere, Wash. / Cashmere
 58	Jeff Denney		3-6	So.	Scottsdale, Ariz. / Brophy Prep
 63	Dwight Donaldson		1-6	Sr.	Tacoma, Wash. / Stadium
 5	Brett Elliott		3-6	Jr.	Lake Oswego, Ore. / U. Utah
 62	Zac Elliott		2-6	Fr.	Sutherlin, Ore. / Sutherlin
 27	Puni Ellis		10-5	Sr.	Kailua, Hawaii / Kamehameha
 87	Eric Fischer		5-6	So.	Medford, Ore. / South Medford
 96	Stan Fisher		2-6	So.	Kailua, Hawaii / Punahou
 45	Zach Fleming		2-6	Sr.	Peoria, Ariz. / Sunrise Mountain
 72	Drew Fogg		2-6	Fr.	Wilsonville, Ore. / Wilsonville
 93	Chad Foglesong		4-6	So.	Centralia, Wash. / Centralia
 4	Thomas Ford		9-5	Sr.	Seattle, Wash. / Mountlake Terrace
 7	Kevin Foreman		3-6	Sr.	Medford, Ore. / North Medford
 25	Andy Galpin		8-5	Sr.	Rochester, Wash. / Rochester
 10	Jesse Gibson		7-5	Fr.	Tualatin, Ore. / Tualatin
 74	Kyle Gibson		3-6	Sr.	Eugene, Ore. / South Eugene
 59	Zack Goldberg		2-6	Fr.	Angels Camp, Calif. / Bret Harte
 54	Michael Greenberg		2-6	Jr.	Vancouver, Wash. / Mountain View
 21	O.J. Gulley		10-5	Sr.	Portland, Ore. / Reynolds
 3	Brandon Hazenberg		11-5	Jr.	Newberg, Ore. / Newberg
 13	Nelson Helland		1-6	Fr.	Gresham, Ore. / Centennial
 50	Brody Hess		1-6	So.	Keizer, Ore. / McNary
 10	Eric Hillison		10-5	Sr.	Beaverton, Ore. / Beaverton
 77	James Holan		6-6	Jr.	Mill Valley, Calif. / Tamalpais
 79	Eric Holtgraves		5-6	Sr.	Tualatin, Ore. / Tualatin
 75	Sean Horning		0-6	Jr.	Peoria, Ariz. / Centennial
 44	Ryan Ishizu		8-5	Fr.	Pukalani, Hawaii / Maui
 6	Riley Jenkins		0-6	Sr.	Salem, Ore. / Oregon State
 63	Grant Jones		0-6	Fr.	Newport, Ore. / Newport
 65	Jimmy Joyce		3-6	Fr.	Beaveton, Ore. / Beaverton
 84	Tyler Kaluza		0-6	So.	Issaquah, Wash / Skyline
 52	Kevin Kauweloa		0-6	So.	Waianae, Hawaii / Waianae
 60	Drew Kehoe		3-6	Sr.	West Linn, Ore. / West Linn
 59	John Kemper		2-6	So.	Gresham, Ore. / Sam Barlow
 11	Rob Kerns		2-6	So.	Potlatch, Idaho / Whitworth College
 91	Mike Ketler		0-6	Jr.	Salem, Ore. / South Salem
 78	Jacob Kleffner		0-6	So.	Tigard, Ore. / Jesuit
 71	Danny Kleiber		3-6	So.	Sammamish, Wash. / Skyline
 26	Mordechai Kotler		8-5	Sr.	Fountain Valley, Calif. / Fountain Valley
 4	Natty Krauss		11-5	Fr.	Selma, Ore. / Illinois Valley
 98	Jeff Kutter		2-6	Fr.	Banks, Ore. / Banks
 20	Carl Lam		8-5	Fr.	Kamuela, Hawaii / Hawaii Prep
 41	Reece Lamson		11-5	So.	Corning, Calif. / Feather River C.C.
 3	Clint Languemi		0-6	Jr.	Elk Grove, Calif. / Elk Grove
 1	Scott Lasswell		10-5	So.	Tigard, Ore. / Tigard
 18	Brad Lau		9-5	So.	Kamuela, Hawaii / Hawaii Prep
 23	Tyler Legary		0-6	So.	University Place, Wash. / Knox College
 24	Chet Lemon		11-5	Fr.	Knoxville, Tenn. / Campbellsville U.
 57	Matt Lowe		2-6	Fr.	Beaverton, Ore. / Beaverton
 66	Jake Lucey		4-6	Jr.	Keizer, Ore. / McNary
 64	Joe Mannix		0-6	Fr.	Canby, Ore. / Canby
 18	Travis Masters		8-5	So.	Elk Grove, Calif. / Elk Grove
 38	Stefan Matheny		0-6	Jr.	Lexington, Ore. / Heppner
 89	Martin Mays		2-6	So.	Lake Oswego, Ore. / Lake Oswego
 33	Mitch McClelland		0-6	Fr.	Tigard, Ore. / Tigard
 95	Matt McCullough		2-6	Fr.	Hillsboro, Ore. / Glencoe
 73	Rob McCullough		5-6	Jr.	Irvine, Calif. / University
 29	Brad McKechnie		11-5	Sr.	Puyallup, Wash. / Rogers
 16	Brian Mehl		0-6	So.	Eugene, Ore. / Churchill
 16	D.J. Meier		1-6	Fr.	Salem, Ore. / McKay
 55	Chris Miles		2-6	Sr.	Junction City, Ore. / Junction City
 93	Gus Morrison		1-6	Fr.	San Francisco, Calif. / George Washington
 80	Reid Muller		1-6	Fr.	Portland, Ore. / Franklin
 14	Lance Nelson		11-5	Fr.	Clackamas, Ore. / Clackamas
 94	Scott Olsen		2-6	Fr.	St. Helens, Ore. / St. Helens
 28	Brandon Olson		0-6	So.	Wilsonville, Ore. / Wilsonville
 68	Andrew O'Neal		3-6	Jr.	Tigard, Ore. / Tigard
 9	Josh Ort		11-5	Jr.	Silverton, Ore. / Silverton
 38	Chris Parrette		9-5	Fr.	Fremont, Calif. / Bellarmine Prep
 51	Chris Pelow		1-6	So.	Eugene, Ore. / Sheldon
 48	Louis Penn		0-6	Fr.	Troutdale, Ore. / Reynolds
 46	Bryan Pereboom		11-5	Jr.	Prescott, Ariz. / Prescott
 52	Brandon Petersen		1-6	Sr.	Lake Oswego, Ore. / Lake Oswego
 89	Jacob Peterson		0-6	Fr.	Myrtle Point, Ore. / Myrtle Point
 41	Sean Radford		8-5	Fr.	Myrtle Creek, Ore. / South Umpqua
 53	Drew Ragan		11-5	Fr.	Bellevue, Wash. / Sammamish
 66	Lance Reem		8-5	Fr.	Burbank, Calif. / Ribet Academy
 98	Mike Richardson		0-6	Fr.	Salem, Ore. / McKay
 82	Colby Riddle		2-6	Fr.	Lake Oswego, Ore. / U. Oregon
 27	Derek Robinson		11-5	Fr.	Marcola, Ore. / Mohawk
 11	Cam Rogers		3-6	Jr.	Tacoma, Wash. / Wilson
 37	Phil Rombach		2-6	Jr.	Portland, Ore. / Jesuit
 36	Joe Romero		1-6	Jr.	Melba, Idaho / Melba
 2	Ed Rosario		7-5	Fr.	Newberg, Ore. / Newberg
 67	Kiki Sagoian		1-6	Sr.	Kirkland, Wash. / Lake Washington
 15	Trevor Scharer		4-6	So.	Salem, Ore. / McKay
 69	Zach Schumpert		1-6	Jr.	Monroe, Wash. / Monroe
 90	Joe Seifert		0-6	Fr.	Canby, Ore. / Canby
 76	Colby Shaffer		2-6	Jr.	Tumwater, Wash. / Tumwater
 13	Ryan Smith		9-5	Fr.	Stanwood, Wash. / Stanwood
 33	Ty Smith		8-5	Sr.	Dallas, Ore. / Dallas
 7	Eric Snow		1-6	Fr.	Twin Falls, Idaho / Twin Falls
 49	Nik Soo		0-6	So.	Kamuela, Hawaii / Kamehameha
 15	Ty Stanley		11-5	Fr.	Vancouver, Wash. / Columbia River
 92	Matt Steffens		3-6	So.	Yuba City, Calif. / Yuba City
 35	Keone Tawata		11-5	So.	Honolulu, Hawaii / Radford
 30	Chris Thorpe		9-5	Fr.	Kanoehe, Hawaii / Radford
 56	Brandon Tom		2-6	Jr.	Kailua, Hawaii / Kamehameha
 46	Tim Vaughan		9-5	Fr.	Haines, Ore. / Baker
 85	Joey Vieceli		1-6	So.	Issaquah, Wash. / Skyline
 82	Josh Vierra		11-5	So.	Kaneohe, Hawaii / Kamehameha
 62	Matt Wakeford-Evans		1-6	Fr.	Sacramento, Calif. / Del Oro
 48	Garrett Wales		0-6	Jr.	Bend, Ore. / Mountain View
 24	Travis Warneke		11-5	Fr.	Portland, Ore. / Reynolds
 83	Kyle Warner		2-6	So.	Vancouver, Wash. / Mountain View
 86	Tyler Weaver		10-5	Fr.	Keizer, Ore. / McNary
 19	James Wilson		2-6	Sr.	Springfield, Ore. / Thurston
 54	Kris Wood		3-6	Fr.	Banks, Ore. / Banks
 39	Andrew Woods		1-6	So.	Portland, Ore. / Grant
 23	Phil Zahn		0-6	Fr.	Newberg, Ore. / Newberg
 36	Alex Zerzan		9-5	Fr.	Eugene, Ore. / Marist

References

Linfield Wildcats
Linfield Wildcats football seasons
NCAA Division III Football Champions
College football undefeated seasons
Linfield Wildcats football